Sir Sigmund Sternberg  (2 June 1921 – 18 October 2016) was a Hungarian-British philanthropist, interfaith campaigner, businessman and Labour Party donor.

Early life
Sternberg was born in 1921 in Budapest, Hungary. He was Jewish. He emigrated to England in 1939, and was naturalised as a British citizen in 1947.

Career
Sternberg worked in the scrap metal trade. After the war, he founded Sternberg Group of Companies. By 1968 he retired from the scrap metal trade and focused on commercial property investments.

Philanthropy
Sternberg worked in promoting dialogue between different faiths. For example, he relocated a Roman Catholic convent at Auschwitz. Moreover, he organised the first papal visit to a synagogue in 1986. Additionally, he negotiated the Vatican's recognition of the state of Israel.

He was a long-term Labour Party supporter and donor.

Sternberg established The Sir Sigmund Sternberg Charitable Foundation in 1969 and was one of the co-founders of the Three Faiths Forum. Sternberg was Life President of the Movement for Reform Judaism. He was chairman of the Sternberg Interfaith Gold Medallion.

In 1976, Sternberg was knighted by Queen Elizabeth II, and in 1985 he was made a Papal Knight Commander of the Order of St. Gregory the Great (KCSG) by Pope John Paul II. He was awarded the Templeton Prize for Progress in Religion in 1998 for his interfaith work worldwide. In November 2005, Sternberg was promoted to the highest rank within the Royal Order of Francis I to the grade of Knight Grand Cross (GCFO), this in recognition of his contributions to furthering the interfaith activities of the British and Irish Delegation. In 2008, he received the FIRST International Award for Responsible Capitalism, lifetime achievement medal.

Personal life and death
Sternberg married Ruth Schiff in 1949. They had a son, Michael Sternberg, and a daughter, artist Frances Aviva Blane. They divorced in 1969, and he later married Hazel Sternberg, who died in 2014. He died on 18 October 2016.

References

External links
Profile from the Three Faiths Forum
A portrait of Sir Sigmund (1998) by Valerie Wiffen, Sir Sigmund Sternberg by Valerie Wiffen, oil on canvas, 1998, is in the National Portrait Gallery, London.

1921 births
2016 deaths
Templeton Prize laureates
Hungarian Jews
British Jews
Hungarian emigrants to the United Kingdom
Naturalised citizens of the United Kingdom
Knights Bachelor
Knights of St. Gregory the Great
Labour Party (UK) donors
British people of Hungarian-Jewish descent